Diplacus is a plant genus in the family Phrymaceae, which was traditionally placed in family Scrophulariaceae. In the 2012 restructuring of Mimulus by Barker, et al., based largely upon DNA evidence, seven species were left in Mimulus, 111 placed into Erythranthe (species with axile placentation and long pedicels), 46 placed into Diplacus (species with parietal placentation and sessile flowers), two placed in Uvedalia, and one each placed in Elacholoma, Mimetanthe, and Thyridia. Diplacus used to be a separate genus from Mimulus, but it was merged into Mimulus no later than 1905, until the 2012 restructuring. Dry and rocky areas are preferred.

Species
Species include:
 Diplacus angustatus (A.Gray) G.L.Nesom
 Diplacus aridus Abrams
 Diplacus aurantiacus (Curtis) Jeps.
 Diplacus × australis (McMinn ex Munz) Tulig
 Diplacus bigelovii (A.Gray) G.L.Nesom
 Diplacus bolanderi (A.Gray) G.L.Nesom
 Diplacus brandegeei (Pennell) G.L.Nesom
 Diplacus brevipes (Benth.) G.L.Nesom
 Diplacus calycinus Eastw.
 Diplacus clevelandii (Brandegee) Greene
 Diplacus clivicola (Greenm.) G.L.Nesom
 Diplacus compactus (D.M.Thomps.) G.L.Nesom
 Diplacus congdonii (B.L.Rob.) G.L.Nesom
 Diplacus constrictus (A.L.Grant) G.L.Nesom
 Diplacus cusickii (Greene) G.L.Nesom
 Diplacus douglasii (Benth.) G.L.Nesom
 Diplacus fremontii (Benth.) G.L.Nesom
 Diplacus grandiflorus Groenl.
 Diplacus jepsonii (A.L.Grant) G.L.Nesom
 Diplacus johnstonii (A.L.Grant) G.L.Nesom
 Diplacus kelloggii (Curran ex Greene) G.L.Nesom
 Diplacus latifolius Nutt.
 Diplacus layneae (Greene) G.L.Nesom
 Diplacus leptaleus (A.Gray) G.L.Nesom
 Diplacus linearis (Benth.) Greene
 Diplacus × lompocensis McMinn
 Diplacus longiflorus Nutt.
 Diplacus mephiticus (Greene) G.L.Nesom
 Diplacus mohavensis (Lemmon) G.L.Nesom
 Diplacus nanus (Hook. & Arn.) G.L.Nesom
 Diplacus ovatus (A.Gray) G.L.Nesom
 Diplacus parryi (A.Gray) G.L.Nesom & N.S.Fraga
 Diplacus parviflorus Greene
 Diplacus pictus (Curran ex Greene) G.L.Nesom
 Diplacus pulchellus (Drew ex Greene) G.L.Nesom
 Diplacus puniceus Nutt.
 Diplacus pygmaeus (A.L.Grant) G.L.Nesom
 Diplacus rattanii (A.Gray) G.L.Nesom
 Diplacus rupicola (Coville & A.L.Grant) G.L.Nesom & N.S.Fraga
 Diplacus rutilis (A.L.Grant) McMinn
 Diplacus stellatus Kellogg
 Diplacus torreyi (A.Gray) G.L.Nesom
 Diplacus traskiae (A.L.Grant) G.L.Nesom
 Diplacus tricolor (Hartw. ex Lindl.) G.L.Nesom
 Diplacus vandenbergensis (D.M.Thomps.) G.L.Nesom
 Diplacus viscidus (Congdon) G.L.Nesom
 Diplacus whitneyi (A.Gray) G.L.Nesom

References 

 
Lamiales genera